Walden is a dale and hamlet in the Yorkshire Dales, North Yorkshire, England. The dale is a side dale of Wensleydale, sometimes known as Waldendale or Walden Dale to distinguish it from the hamlet.

The name Walden, first recorded in 1270, comes from the Old English wala denu, meaning "valley of the Welshmen".

References

External links

 Walden in the Upper Dales website

Villages in North Yorkshire
Wensleydale